Gentil may refer to:

People:
Jean-Paul Alaux, called Gentil, French landscape painter and lithographer
Émile Gentil, a French colonial administrator
Guillaume Le Gentil, a French astronomer
Jean-François Gentil, a French colonial officer
Joseph Philippe Gentil, Mauritian composer
Otto Gentil, German sculptor

Places:
Gentil, Rio Grande do Sul, a municipality in Brazil
Port-Gentil, a city in Gabon

Other:
Gentil, a white wine blend from Alsace